Putu (also Romanized as Pūtū) is a village in Saroleh Rural District, Meydavud District, Bagh-e Malek County, Khuzestan Province, Iran. At the 2006 census, its population was 392, in 76 families.

References 

Populated places in Bagh-e Malek County